Alexandra Elizabeth Roach (born 20 August 1987) is a Welsh actress best known for her roles as Becky in Utopia and DS Joy Freers in No Offence. She has also made appearances in series including Being Human, Inside No. 9, Black Mirror and Killing Eve.

Life and career
Roach was born in Ammanford, Carmarthenshire, Wales. A number of her relatives, including her father Jeff (who went on to work for the Welsh Rugby Union), her brother and her sister, have been part of the police force at one point. A fluent Welsh speaker, Roach appeared in long-running television soap Pobol Y Cwm in her early teens and won Best Juvenile Actor in a Soap at the Children in Entertainment Awards. After leaving the series in 2005, she spent time with the National Youth Theatre of Wales before going on to the Royal Academy of Dramatic Art, graduating with a B.A. in acting in 2010.

She has described how her Welsh accent counted against her in an early audition for a television role. "This old guy was the director and he was so well spoken, and he asked me where I was from, and I told him: 'Wales, Swansea,' and he just blanked me and turned to the casting director and said, 'oh no, she's not right'" ... So I said, 'I'm not going to do it in this voice, I'm going to do it with an English accent,' and he was like, 'no, honestly, there's no point'. He just wouldn't look at me, he wasn't listening to me."

In May 2010 Roach appeared in The Door Never Closes by Rex Obano at the Almeida Theatre. A number of high-profile roles followed, including Sasha in Being Human, Beth Partridge in Candy Cabs, and The Suspicions of Mr Whicher (in which she played notorious child murderer Constance Kent).

Roach starred as a young Margaret Thatcher in The Iron Lady. She appeared as Helene in Sky Comedy's Hunderby in autumn 2012, and was cast as Molly in the film adaptation of Michael Morpurgo's 2003 novel Private Peaceful. She was included on the Screen International "Stars of Tomorrow" list in 2011. In 2013, she starred in the British TV series Utopia.

On 3 June 2013, Roach appeared in the fifth episode of the ITV comedy Vicious, as Ash's vegan girlfriend Chloe. She returned to the role for one episode in June 2015. On 8 August 2014, she appeared in the inaugural episode of the BBC One TV comedy drama film Walter, in which she played a Welsh-speaking detective. In 2015 she starred in the TV series No Offence as DS Joy Freers.

In 2016 she became engaged to club promoter Jack Scales, whom she later married.

Roach was a presenter at the 2017 BAFTA Cymru Awards ceremony.

Filmography

Film

Television

Video games
 Du Lac & Fey: Dance of Death (2019), as Mary Jane Kelly (voice role)

References

External links

1987 births
Living people
Welsh-speaking actors
Welsh film actresses
Welsh soap opera actresses
British film actresses
British soap opera actresses
British television actresses
21st-century Welsh actresses
People from Ammanford
Alumni of RADA